In mathematics, a semi-infinite programming (SIP) problem is an optimization problem with a finite number of variables and an infinite number of constraints. The constraints are typically parameterized. In a generalized semi-infinite programming (GSIP) problem, the feasible set of the parameters depends on the variables.

Mathematical formulation of the problem 
The problem can be stated simply as:

where

In the special case that the set : is nonempty for all  GSIP can be cast as bilevel programs (Multilevel programming).

Methods for solving the problem

Examples

See also 
 optimization
 Semi-Infinite Programming (SIP)

References

External links
Mathematical Programming Glossary

Optimization in vector spaces